James Lockwood (born 21 March 1986) is a professional rugby league footballer who plays as a  or  forward for Featherstone Rovers in the Betfred Championship.

He has previously played at club level for the Dewsbury Rams.

Background
Lockwood was born in Wakefield, West Yorkshire, England.

Playing career

Featherstone Rovers
On 21 April 2015 it was reported that Lockwood had been banned for two years after breaching the Rugby Football League's anti-doping regulations.
In June 2019 Lockwood committed to a two-year contract extension
Lockwood played for Featherstone in their 2021 Million Pound Game loss against Toulouse Olympique.
On 28 May 2022, Lockwood played for Featherstone in their 2022 RFL 1895 Cup final loss against Leigh.

References

External links

Featherstone Rovers profile

1986 births
Living people
Dewsbury Rams players
English rugby league players
Featherstone Rovers captains
Featherstone Rovers players
Rugby league players from Wakefield
Rugby league props
Rugby league second-rows